Abdulrahman Faiz Al-Rashidi (Arabic: عبد الرحمن فايز الرشيدي) (born 10 September 1994) is a Qatari footballer plays for Umm Salal as a defender.

References

External links
 

Qatari footballers
1994 births
Living people
Al-Gharafa SC players
Umm Salal SC players
Qatar Stars League players
Association football defenders